The discography of American rock band Manchester Orchestra consists of six studio albums, one acoustic album, one live album, seven extended plays and twelve singles.

Albums

Studio

Acoustic

Live

Extended plays

Singles

Music videos
 "Wolves at Night" (2007)
 "I Can Barely Breathe" (2008)
 "Now That You're Home" (2008)
 "Golden Ticket" (2008)
 "I've Got Friends" (2009)
 "Tony the Tiger" (2009)
 "Shake It Out" (Ver. 1) (2009)
 "Shake It Out" (Ver. 2) (2009)
 "The Only One" (2009)
 "I Can Feel a Hot One" (2009)
 "In My Teeth" (2009)
 "Pride" (2009)
 "100 Dollars" (2009)
 "Everything to Nothing" (2009)
 "My Friend Marcus" (2009)
 "The River" (2009)
 "Simple Math" (2011)
 "Virgin" (2011)
 "Top Notch" (2014)
 "The Gold" (2017)
 "The Alien" (2017)
 "The Moth" (2017)
 "The Sunshine" (2017)
 "I Know How to Speak" (2018)
 "The Silence" (2018)
 "Bed Head" (2021)
 "Keel Timing" (2021)
 "Telepath" (2021)

Notes

References

Discographies of American artists
Rock music group discographies